Grady Gaines (May 14, 1934 – January 29, 2021) was an American electric blues, Texas blues and jazz blues tenor saxophonist, who performed and recorded with Little Richard in the 1950s. He backed other musicians such as Dee Clark, Little Willie John, Sam Cooke, James Brown, Jackie Wilson, and Joe Tex. He released three albums.

Early life 
Gaines was born on May 14, 1934, in Waskom, Texas. Gaines's brother was  Roy. In 1943, Gaines family moved to Houston, Texas. Gaines grew up in the Fifth Ward, a racially segregated neighborhood of Houston, Texas.
Gaines attended E. L. Smith Junior High School.

Career 
Gaines was playing his saxophone at The Whispering Pines.

Gaines worked as a session musician for Peacock Records. He played on Big Walter Price's "Pack Fair and Square" and Clarence "Gatemouth" Brown's "Dirty Work at the Crossroads," before joining Little Richard's fledgling backing band, the Upsetters, as its leader in 1955. Gaines recorded infrequently, but he played on Richard's "Keep a Knockin'" and "Ooh! My Soul."

The Upsetters carried on after Richard "retired" in 1957. They toured with Dee Clark, Little Willie John, James Brown, Jackie Wilson, and Joe Tex. The band recorded for Vee-Jay Records in 1958 backing Clark. Gaines also led Sam Cooke's backing band until Cooke's death. Several recording sessions followed for Gaines and his band for various labels, including Vee-Jay, Gee and Fire.

Once the Upsetters disbanded, Grady toured with Millie Jackson and Curtis Mayfield. He stopped playing in 1980.

In 1980, Gaines became a transportation manager for Holiday Inn and later Sheraton.

In 1985, Gaines re-formed a band, The Texas Upsetters, and played concerts in Houston before recording Full Gain (1988), Horn of Plenty (1992), and Jump Start (2002).

Gaines performed in 1989 and 1996 at the Long Beach Blues Festival. As of January 2013, he continued to perform with the Texas Upsetters for private parties and wedding receptions and for public events, such as the Big Easy Social & Pleasure Club in Houston's Rice Village neighborhood.

DiscographyFull Gain (1988), Black Top RecordsHorn of Plenty (1992), Black TopJump Start'' (2002), Gulf Coast Entertainment

Awards 
 1993 Blues Artist of the Year. Houston Juneteenth Festival.
 2001 Local Musician of the Year. Houston Press.

Personal life 
Gaines' wife was Nell Gaines, they remained married until his death in 2021.

Gaines' brother Roy went on to play guitar on Bobby Bland's 1955 hit single "It's My Life Baby".

See also
List of Texas blues musicians
List of electric blues musicians

References

External links
Grady Gaines Interview – NAMM Oral History Library (2015)
 Grady Gaines & the Texas Upsetters at gulfcoastentertainment.com
 
 

1934 births
2021 deaths
American blues saxophonists
Electric blues musicians
Texas blues musicians
American session musicians
People from Waskom, Texas